Delia Arnold (born 26 January 1986, in Kuala Lumpur) is a former professional squash player who represented Malaysia. She reached a career-high world ranking of World No. 12.

Career
Arnold, coached by Ahmed Malik and Peter Genever began playing on the PSA tour in 2003 and reached 48th spot in the world rankings by February 2006. More than ten months later, she moved up at the 34th spot. 

In 2010, she was part of the Malaysian team that won the bronze medal at the 2010 Women's World Team Squash Championships. Two years later in 2012, she was again part of the Malaysian team that won the bronze medal at the 2012 Women's World Team Squash Championships. In 2014, she was part of the Malaysian team that won the silver medal at the 2014 Women's World Team Squash Championships.

In May 2015 she defeated world No.3 Alison Waters from England, world No.11 Annie Au from Hong Kong and world No.3 Raneem El Weleily from Egypt in the 2015 Women's British Open Squash Championship where she was eventually defeated by current world No.3 Camille Serme from France in the semi final. She reached a career-high world ranking of World No. 12 in September 2015 after beating World Number 2, El Weleily in the quarter finals of the British Open.

In 2017, she announced her immediate retirement from squash.

Personal life
She married badminton international Robert Lin Woon Fui.

WISPA Titles
All Results for Delia Arnold in WISPA World's Tour tournament

References

External links 

1986 births
Living people
Malaysian female squash players
Sportspeople from Kuala Lumpur
Malaysian people of Chinese descent
Commonwealth Games competitors for Malaysia
Squash players at the 2010 Commonwealth Games
Squash players at the 2014 Commonwealth Games
Asian Games medalists in squash
Asian Games gold medalists for Malaysia
Squash players at the 2010 Asian Games
Squash players at the 2014 Asian Games
Medalists at the 2010 Asian Games
Medalists at the 2014 Asian Games
20th-century Malaysian women
21st-century Malaysian women